Aaron Curry may refer to:

 Aaron Curry (American football) (born 1986), American football linebacker 
 Aaron Curry (politician) (1887–1957), British MP
Aaron Curry (artist), winner of the Berlin Prize
ORFN, born Aaron Curry (1974–2016), graffiti artist active in the San Francisco Bay Area
Aaron Curry (producer) from Fight Club (novel)